Oru Yathramozhi is a 1997 Indian Malayalam-language drama film directed by Prathap Pothan, based on a story by Priyadarshan and a screenplay by John Paul. It stars  Sivaji Ganeshan and Mohanlal. It was produced by V. B. K. Menon and distributed by Anugraha Release. The music was composed by Ilaiyaraaja.

Plot

It is a story about a father and a son, which is filled with sentiment or sorrow. Govindankutty is on the lookout for his unknown father seeking to take revenge by killing him for leaving him and his mother. Then enters Anantha Subramaniam a Tamil government contractor, who comes to Govindankutty's hometown and likes him instantly for his loyalty and honesty.

Both of them become very close to each other. The story takes a turn when Govindankutty's mother recognizes the contractor as her long-lost husband. She dies fearing that Govindankutty will kill his father on knowing the truth. The story then comes to the climax as to whether Govindankutty knows who his father is and what happens next.

Cast

Production
Swarnachamaram is a film that was shelved as a result of creative differences over the topic of mercy killing. Many scenes were edited out of the film along with a song by Sivaji Ganeshan and Mohanlal.  Producer V. B. K. Menon used the same dates and completed Oru Yathramozhi, starring Sivaji Ganesan and Mohanlal. The movie was not released until a year or so after completion.

Soundtrack

Release
The film's initial release date was 15 August 1996, but the release was postponed and finally graced theatres only in 1997. The film was dubbed in Tamil as Payanathin Mozhi.

References

External links
 
 http://www.malayalasangeetham.info/php/MovieDetails.php?mid=1457&encode=utf

1997 films
1990s Malayalam-language films
Films scored by Ilaiyaraaja
Indian drama films
Films shot in Palakkad
Films directed by Pratap Pothen